Diversibipalium multilineatum is a species of large predatory land flatworm.

The species is native to Japan.

It has been recorded in 2016 for the first time outside Asia, from Bologna, Italy (from a finding in September 2014), and in several localities in France. More records in 2021 confirmed its presence in various regions of Italy. It is thus an alien species to Europe.

References 

Geoplanidae
Fauna of Japan
Fauna of Italy